Bitis heraldica is a venomous viper species endemic to Angola. It is easily distinguished from B. caudalis by its heavily speckled belly and lack of any supraocular "horns". No subspecies are currently recognized.

Taxonomy
Its common names include Angolan adder and Bocage's horned adder.

Description

Distribution and habitat
It is found on the high plateau of central Angola.

The type locality given is "sur les bords de la rivière Calae, l'un des affluents de Cunene, entre le 13o et 14o parallèle á l'est de Caconda." [Calai River (tributary of the Kunene), Cacanda, Angola.

It commonly inhabits rocky mountain slopes.

Behavior
Nothing is known of its behavior, as less than 20 specimens have ever been collected.

Venom
Nothing is known of the venom composition, and no bites have ever been recorded.

References

Further reading
Bocage JVB du. 1889. Mélanges erpétologiques. II. Sur une Vipère apparemment nouvelle d'Angola. Jornal de Sciencias Mathematicas, Physicas e Naturaes, Academia Real das Sciencias de Lisboa, Segunda Série 1: 127-128. (Vipera heraldica, nov. sp.)

heraldica
Snakes of Africa
Endemic fauna of Angola
Reptiles of Angola
Reptiles described in 1889
Taxa named by José Vicente Barbosa du Bocage